All That: Fresh out the Box is a 112-page All That collectors book that was released on October 1, 1998, and is distributed by Nickelodeon, Tollin/Robbins Productions, and Pocket Books. Released before the fifth season, the book only includes information on the first four seasons of the show.

Cast featured

Angelique Bates (Season 1 – Season 2)
Amanda Bynes (Season 3 – Season 6)
Lori Beth Denberg (Season 1 – Season 4)
Leon Frierson (Season 4 — Season 6)
Katrina Johnson (Season 1 – Season 3)
Christy Knowings (Season 4 — Season 6)
Kel Mitchell (Season 1 – Season 5)
Alisa Reyes (Season 1 – Season 3)
Josh Server (Season 1 – Season 6)
Danny Tamberelli (Season 4 — Season 6)
Kenan Thompson (Season 1 – Season 5)

Other features
The Characters – The cast members sketch characters; this also includes the info of each character
The Episodes – Seasons 1-4, 77 episodes detailed total
The Special Guest – Includes Musical and Special guest combined
The Trivia Contest – A personality test of how smart someone knows All That well
Behind the Scenes – This includes The Cast, The Crew, and Directors/Writers around the set

References

All That
1998 books
Books based on television series
Pocket Books books